Gaizhou, formerly Gaixian, Gaiping, and Kaiping, is a county-level city in Liaoning province, China.

Administrative divisions
There are six subdistricts, 18 towns, and three townships under the city's administration.

Subdistricts:
Gulou Subdistrict, Xicheng Subdistrict, Dongcheng Subdistrict, Taiyangsheng Subdistrict, Tuanshan Subdistrict, Xihai Subdistrict

Towns:
Gaotun, Shagang, Jiulongdi, Jiuzhai, Wanfu, Wolongquan, Qingshiling, Nuanquan, Guizhou, Bangshibu, Tuandian, Shuangtai, Yangyun, Xutun, Shizijie, Kuangdonggou, Chentun, Liangtun,

Townships:
Xiaoshipeng Township, Guoyuan Township, Ertai Township

Climate

References

External links

 
County-level divisions of Liaoning
Yingkou